Howard Burton is a physicist who is the creator of Ideas Roadshow, a multimedia initiative dedicated to harnessing the benefits of modern technology to explore ideas across the arts and sciences through thoughtful and seriously-entertaining documentary films, books and podcasts. Ideas Roadshow was the recipient of the Educational Learning Resources Award at The London Book Fair's International Excellence Awards in 2018.

Burton holds an M.A. in philosophy and a Ph.D. in theoretical physics, and was the founding executive director of Perimeter Institute for Theoretical Physics in Waterloo, Canada, from 1999–2007. He received a Distinguished Alumni Award from the University of Waterloo in 2007.

His book First Principles: Building Perimeter Institute tells the history of the founding years of Perimeter Institute.

References

External links
Ideas Roadshow website

Living people
Theoretical physicists
Year of birth missing (living people)